Laura Frankos-Turtledove is an American author born February 9, 1960. She writes as Laura Frankos.

Biography
Frankos is married to the science fiction author Harry Turtledove and has three daughters: Alison, Rachel, and Rebecca. Her brother is fantasy author Steven Frankos.

Literary career
Frankos has written mysteries, fantasy and science fiction stories. She has published one mystery novel, Saint Oswald's Niche, which is currently out of print, a time travel novel, Broadway Revival, and The Broadway Musical Quiz Book. Frankos also writes the Broadway history column "The Great White Wayback Machine" and has published numerous trivia quizzes about Broadway plays.

Bibliography

Novels
St. Oswald's Niche (1992)
Broadway Revival (2021)

Non-fiction
The Broadway Musical Quiz Book (2010)

Short stories
"Hoofer" (1993)
"A Beak for Trends" (1994)
"The Njuggle" (1995)
"The Old Grind" (1995) (published on-line here)
"Slue-Foot Sue and the Witch in the Woods" (1998)
"Leg Irons, the Bitch and the Wardrobe" (1999)
"The Great White Way" (2000)
"Merchants of Discord" (2000)
"A Late Symmer Night's Battle" (2004) (published on-line here)
"The Sea Mother's Gift" (2004)
"Natural Selection" (2005)
"The Garden Gnome Freedom Front" (2005)
"One Touch of Hippolyta" (2015)

References

External links
Harry Turtledove - Associated Authors

1960 births
Living people
Harry Turtledove
20th-century American novelists
American mystery writers
American fantasy writers
American science fiction writers
American women short story writers
American women novelists
Women science fiction and fantasy writers
Women mystery writers
20th-century American women writers
20th-century American short story writers